Italy is Popular (IP) is a Christian-democratic political party active in Italy.

History
IP was launched as a split from the Union of the Centre (UdC) in November 2017 by Giuseppe De Mita, nephew of Ciriaco De Mita, a former leader of Christian Democracy and Prime Minister of Italy during 1980s. For the 2017 Sicilian regional election the UdC re-joined the centre-right coalition at the regional level. Giuseppe De Mita criticised the decision, was relinquished as UdC's deputy secretary, and, along with his uncle Ciriaco and Marco Follini, launched IP.

In December IP formed the Popular Civic List (CP), a centrist electoral list within the centre-left coalition, along with Popular Alternative (AP), Italy of Values (IdV), the Centrists for Europe (CpE), Solidary Democracy (DemoS), the Union for Trentino (UpT) and minor parties/groups. Minister of Health Beatrice Lorenzin was chosen as leader.

In the 2018 general election CP obtained a mere 0.5% and no seats, except for a handful of elects in single-seat constituencies. De Mita was defeated in the single-seat constituency of Ariano Irpino, where he came third.

References

External links
 Official website

2017 establishments in Italy
Christian democratic parties in Italy
Catholic political parties
Political parties established in 2017
Political parties in Campania